Amira, also Jebel el Amira, is a Niger–Congo language spoken in Kordofan, Sudan. It is sometimes considered a dialect of Lafofa, which is poorly attested.

References

Sources
Roger Blench, 2011 (ms), "Does Kordofanian constitute a group and if not, where does its languages fit into Niger-Congo?"

Lafofa languages